Strengen is a municipality in the district of Landeck in the Austrian state of Tyrol located 7.7 km west of the city of Landeck. The village was first mentioned in an atlas in 1774 as "Gstreng". The main source of income is tourism.

People
 Hugo Stoltzenberg, chemist

References

External links

Cities and towns in Landeck District
Verwall Alps